Sartaj Garewal is a British actor and voice artist who works in films, TV, theatre and audio.

His films include The League of Extraordinary Gentlemen (2003), Dirty War (2004), The Infidel (2010) and Baseline (2010).

Notable stage performances include Behind The Beautiful Forevers (National Theatre) 2015. Other theatre includes Romeo & Juliet (Royal Exchange Manchester), Taming of the Shrew (Arcola Theatre), East is East (New Vic Theatre, Stoke), Too Close to Home (Lyric Hammersmith, and Tinderbox (Bush Theatre) 2008.

He played the lead role of Kuljit in the BBC radio drama Silver Street for six years and has narrated various audiobooks including Cutting For Stone by Abraham Verghese, Jubilee by Shelley Harris, and Playing It My Way, Sachin Tendulkar's autobiography. He has also featured on The Archers and BBC Radio 4's Book At Bedtime.

Born and raised in Wiltshire, Garewal holds a BA(Hons) Accounting & Finance.

Garewal played Jasper Choudhury in over 50 episodes in Season 2 of the US teen drama House of Anubis for Nickelodeon in 2012.

Filmography

External links

Living people
Year of birth missing (living people)
British male film actors
British male stage actors
British male radio actors
British male actors of Indian descent
English people of Indian descent